"Lil Bit" is a song by American hip hop artist Nelly with country duo Florida Georgia Line.

Lil Bit may also refer to:

 "Lil Bit" (Blackbear song)
 "Lil Bit" (K Camp song)
 "Lil Bit" (Peking Duk and Tommy Trash song)

See also
 Lil Bitts, Trinidadian musician
 "Little Bit", 2008 song by Lykke Li
 A Little Bit (disambiguation)
 Just a Little Bit (disambiguation)